Michael K. Cariglio (born July 19, 1971) is an American professional wrestler, better known by his stage name, Michael Modest (sometimes shortened to Mike Modest). Modest ran the promotion Pro Wrestling IRON with tag partner Donovan Morgan and Frank Murdoch until its closure in 2005. Modest has also wrestled in Japan for Pro Wrestling Noah, winning the GHC Junior Heavyweight Championship after defeating Yoshinobu Kanemaru. He has also wrestled in Canada, Mexico and Ireland. He is perhaps best known for his appearances in the wrestling documentary Beyond the Mat, the film Ready to Rumble, and the TV special Exposed! Pro Wrestling's Greatest Secrets (under a mask as "Private Pain").

Professional wrestling career 
Modest began wrestling in 1991, and has worked for All Pro Wrestling, Universal Wrestling Association, and World Championship Wrestling (WCW), along with both AAA and Consejo Mundial de Lucha Libre (CMLL) in Mexico. Modest had try-out matches for both the World Wrestling Federation (WWF) and WCW, and eventually got signed to a WCW contract, although he was released after WWF bought WCW. After his release, he began working for Pro Wrestling Noah in Japan. In 2001, he also worked for Stampede Wrestling, and won the North American Heavyweight and Pacific Heavyweight titles. He was the last Pacific Heavyweight Champion.

Modest also operated the Pro Wrestling IRON school and promotion in the US, along with his tag team partner Donovan Morgan. He also briefly worked for Ring of Honor.

On March 18, 2005, Modest won the Mike Lockwood Memorial Tournament held by New Breed Wrestling Association, defeating Jamie Noble in the finals. On February 18, 2006, Modest wrestled in a six-man tag team match with Morgan and Ryan Drago, as "La Migra" on an episode of TNA Impact!. They lost to the Latin American Xchange.

In March 2006, Modest took part in a six-man tag team match with partners Frankie Kazarian and Scott D'Amore against Cibernético, Chessman, and Muerte Cibernética at a AAA taping in Querétaro.

In 2014, YouTube personality Brian Zane interviewed Modest, who described his involvement with the NBC TV special Exposed! Pro Wrestling's Greatest Secrets, where Modest described how the producers of the special orchestrated how they created the special. Modest testified that "they took bits and pieces" of what the producers thought would cause a reaction towards their ultimate goal of proving professional wrestling as fake.

Personal life 
Modest is divorced and has two sons. Modest currently lives in Las Vegas and is working for the Las Vegas Wrestling promotion Future Stars of Wrestling, where he is also the head trainer.

Championships and accomplishments 
 All Pro Wrestling
 APW Worldwide Internet Championship (1 time)
 APW Tag Team Championship (2 times) – with Steve Rizzono (1) and Tony Jones (1)
 APW Universal Heavyweight Championship (5 times)
 APW Cup Tournament (1999)
 Future Stars of Wrestling
 FSW Heavyweight Championship (1 time)
 New Breed Wrestling Association
 Mike Lockwood Memorial Tournament (2005)
 North American Wrestling
 NAW Heavyweight Championship (1 time)
 Pennsylvania Championship Wrestling
 PCW Heavyweight Championship (1 time)
 Pro Wrestling Illustrated
 PWI ranked him #58 of the top 500 singles wrestlers of the year in the PWI 500 in 2003
 Pro Wrestling IRON
 PWI Tag Team Championship (1 time) – with Donovan Morgan
 Pro Wrestling NOAH
 GHC Junior Heavyweight Championship (1 time)
 Stampede Wrestling
 Stampede North American Heavyweight Championship (1 time)
 Stampede Pacific Heavyweight Championship (1 time)
West Coast Wrestling Connection
WCWC Tag Team Championship (1 time) - with G.Q. Gallo

References

External links 

1971 births
20th-century professional wrestlers
21st-century professional wrestlers
American male professional wrestlers
Living people
Professional wrestlers from California
Sportspeople from San Francisco
Stampede Wrestling alumni
GHC Junior Heavyweight Champions
Stampede Wrestling North American Heavyweight Champions